Isigonia is a genus of anyphaenid sac spiders first described by Eugène Simon in 1897. it contains only three species.

References

Anyphaenidae
Araneomorphae genera
Spiders of Central America
Spiders of South America
Taxa named by Eugène Simon